The MTV Video Music Awards Japan (MTV VMAJ for short) are the Japanese version of the MTV Video Music Awards.

Like the MTV Video Music Awards in the United States, in this event artists are awarded for their songs and videos through online voting from the same channel viewers. Initially Japan was part of the MTV Asia Awards, which included all Asian countries, but because of the musical variety existent in Japan, in May 2002 began to hold their own awards independently.

On June 25, 2011, MTV Video Music Japan changed the 2011 ceremony to MTV Video Music Aid Japan 2011 as a charity event for the 2011 Tohoku earthquake and tsunami.

Since 2017 the winners have been announced by the official Instagram account without previous nominations.

Host cities

Awards categories

 Video of the Year
 Album of the Year
 Best Male Video
 Best Female Video
 Best Group Video
 Best New Artist
 Best Rock Video
 Best Pop Video
 Best R&B Video
 Best Hip-Hop Video
 Best Reggae Video
 Best Dance Video
 Best Alternative Video
 Best Video from a Film
 Best Collaboration
 Best Karaokee! Song
 Best Choreography

Most wins

Most wins in a single night

Most wins overall
Updated till 2020.

References

External links
 MTV Japan website

 
Japanese music awards
Awards established in 2002
2002 establishments in Japan